This is a list of Old Melburnians, who are notable former students of Melbourne Grammar School in Melbourne, Victoria, Australia.

Alumni of Melbourne Grammar are known as Old Melburnians (abbreviated to OM, followed by the year of graduation), and automatically become members of the school's alumni association, the Old Melburnians' Society.

Notable alumni include one Governor-General, three Prime Ministers, four State Premiers, three Lord Mayors, three Australians of the Year, two Victoria Cross recipients, ten Supreme Court Justices, fourteen AFL premiership players, forty-two Olympians, four Australian Open champions, and many prominent scientists and entertainers.

Governors 
 Richard Casey – 16th Governor-General of Australia,  Governor of Bengal, former Australian of the Year, and final Australian in the House of Lords
Sir Edmund Herring – longest serving Lieutenant Governor of Victoria

Prime Ministers 
 Stanley Bruce – 8th Prime Minister of Australia
 Alfred Deakin – 2nd Prime Minister of Australia
 Malcolm Fraser – 22nd Prime Minister of Australia

State Premiers 
 Ted Baillieu – 46th Premier of Victoria
 John Brumby – 45th Premier of Victoria
 Sir Rupert Hamer – 39th Premier of Victoria
 Arthur Moore – 23rd Premier of Queensland

Lord Mayors 
 Sir John George Davies – 19th mayor of Hobart and cricketer
 Sir Harold Luxton – 61st Lord Mayor of Melbourne and businessman
 Sir Harold Gengoult Smith – 62nd Lord Mayor of Melbourne and doctor

Australians of the Year 
 Richard Casey – 16th Governor-General of Australia,  Governor of Bengal, former Australian of the Year (1969), and final Australian in the House of Lords
 Manning Clark – historian and former Australian of the Year (1980)
Simon Mckeon – yachtsman, businessman, lawyer, philanthropist, and former Australian of the Year (2011)

Victoria Cross recipients 
 William Joynt – soldier, Victoria Cross winner
 Bill Newton – airman, Victoria Cross winner

Military and security 
 William Anderson – RAAF officer
 Alfred Brookes – first Director-General of the Australian Secret Intelligence Service
Sir Wilfred Deakin Brookes – businessman and RAAF officer
 Sir Samuel Burston – doctor, soldier, horseracing identity
 Adrian Cole – Air Chief Vice Marshall RAAF
 Sir Ernest Gaunt – Royal Navy Admiral
 Sir Guy Gaunt – Royal Navy Admiral and British Conservative member of parliament
 Harold Grimwade – soldier and businessman
 Jo Gullett – soldier, journalist and politician
Sir Vernon Sturdee – Lieutenant-General and Chief of the General Staff
 Sir Edmund Herring – soldier and judge
Richard Minifie – fighter pilot and flying ace
 Cedric Howell – First World War fighter pilot and flying ace
Ronald Hopkins – WWII General
Frederic Hughes – WWI General
Tony Hyams – politician and banker
Sir William Johnston - medical practitioner and army officer
Ian Kennison – 5th Director-General of ASIS
 Sir Ian McIntosh – Royal Navy officer
 Sir Leslie Morshead – soldier (MGS staff member)
 Sir Frank Kingsley Norris – military officer and soldier
 Cyril Seelenmeyer – VFL footballer, veterinary surgeon, winner of Military Cross
 Edward Smart – diplomat and general
 Philip Rhoden – Army officer and lawyer
 Sir Charles Ryan – military surgeon
 Sir Roger Wheeler – former Chief of the General Staff
 Sir Edward Woodward – judge, Royal Commissioner and former head of ASIO
 Gordon Chesney Wilson – army officer

Clergy 
 Horace Crotty – Anglican Bishop of Bathurst
 Peter John Elliott – Auxiliary bishop of the Archdiocese of Melbourne
 Awdry Julius – Dean of Christchurch
 Geraldine MacKenzie – missionary
 John McKie - Archdeacon of Melbourne
 Gerard Tucker – priest and advocate for the poor
 Allen Winter – theological scholar and Bishop

Law and government 
Arthur Abbott – Attorney-General of Western Australia
Sir Keith Aickin – former Justice of the High Court of Australia
Austin Asche – 3rd Chief Justice of the Northern Territory
John Batt – former justice of the Supreme Court
Maurice Blackburn – politician, lawyer and founder of Maurice Blackburn Lawyers
Julian Burnside – barrister and human rights advocate
Sam Calder – politician and flying ace
Frank Callaway – former judge of the Supreme Court
 Sir Harold Winthrop Clapp – transport administrator responsible for an overhaul of Victoria's train network
Les Craig – politician in Western Australia
Sir John George Davies – mayor of Hobart and cricketer
Noël St. Clair Deschamps – public servant and diplomat
Theodore Fink – solicitor and politician
Jo Gullett – soldier, journalist and politician
 Sir Rutherford Guthrie – politician and grazier
David Harper – former judge of the Supreme Court
Sir Edmund Herring – Chief Justice of the Supreme Court and soldier
Sir Edwin Hicks ("Ted") – diplomat and secretary of defence
Sir Henry Hodges - Supreme Court Justice
Vasey Houghton – politician
 Sir Wilfrid Kent Hughes – Rhodes Scholar, politician, Olympic hurdler, and organiser of the 1956 Olympics
Geoffry Hurry – politician and lawyer
 – diplomat
 Sir Reginald Leeper – diplomat and founder of the British Council
 Sir Harold Luxton – businessman and Lord Mayor of Melbourne
 Sir Thomas Chester Manifold – politician and horse breeder
Sir Walter Manifold – president of the Legislative Council
Chris Maxwell – Rhodes Scholar and President of the Victorian Court of Appeal
Kenneth Marks – former Judge of the Supreme Court of Victoria and Royal Commissioner
John McMillan – diplomat
William Moule – politician and cricketer
 Sir Keith Officer – diplomat
 Philip Opas – Barrister; defence counsel for Ronald Ryan
William Ormiston – former Judge of the Supreme Court
 Sir Reginald Sholl – Rhodes scholar and former Judge of Victorian Supreme Court
Tony Street – former Minister for Foreign Affairs
Ted Tanner – Opposition whip (Victorian Legislative Assembly)
John Thwaites – 24th deputy Premier of Victoria
Agar Wynne – politician and Attorney-General of Victoria

Academia 
 Sir Robert Blackwood – businessman and first Vice-Chancellor of Monash University
Mervyn Austin – Rhodes Scholar and former Headmaster of Newington College and professor in classics
Edward Bage – polar explorer
 Sir James William Barrett – ophthalmologist and academic
John F. O. Bilson – Professor of Finance
Manning Clark – historian and former Australian of the Year
Frank Cumbrae-Stewart – barrister and Garrick Professor of Law
Peter Dixon – economist
Pierre Gorman – expert on deaf communication
 Sir John Grice – businessman and Vice-Chancellor of The University of Melbourne
 Sir Russell Grimwade – chemist, botanist, and philanthropist
 Sir Keith Hancock – Rhodes Scholar and historian
 Sir Edward Hughes – eminent surgeon and former president of the Royal Australasian College of Surgeons
 Sir George Julius – inventor of the first tote-board and first chairman of CSIRO
Charles Kellaway – medical researcher and second director of the Walter and Eliza Hall Institute
Richard Larkins – physician and vice-chancellor of Monash University
Miles Lewis – expert on urban conservation
 Sir Irvine Masson – chemist and vice-chancellor of the University of Sheffield
Ainslie Meares – psychiatrist and expert in the medical use of hypnotism
Sir Edward Fancourt Mitchell – barrister and expert in constitutional law
Norval Morris – legal academic and criminologist
Alfred John North – ornithologist
Andrew Prentice – mathematician and expert on the formation of the solar system
John Rymill – Polar explorer
A.G.L. Shaw – historian and academic
Godfrey Tanner – academic
Gerard Tucker – priest and advocate for the poor

Industry 
 Ross Adler – business executive and philanthropist
 Sir Harry Brookes Allen – pathologist
 Clive Baillieu – businessman, public servant, and rower
 Robert Champion de Crespigny – multi-millionaire founder of Normandy Mining Limited and former Australian Businessman of the Year
 Martin Chapman – New Zealand barrister and founder of Chapman Tripp
 Sir Peter Derham – business executive and philanthropist
 Carrillo Gantner – founder of the Playbox Theater and patron of the arts, former Victorian of the Year
 Michael Georgeff – computer scientist
 Aubrey Gibson – businessman and philanthropist
 Sir John Grice – businessman and Vice-Chancellor of The University of Melbourne
 Sir Russell Grimwade - businessman and philanthropist
 Simon Mckeon – champion yachtsman, businessman, lawyer, philanthropist, and Australian of the Year
 Lancelot de Mole – engineer and inventor of the first tank
 Andrew Michelmore – Rhodes Scholar, mining executive, and first Australian gold medal for rowing
 Brian Roet – hypnotist and AFL premiership winner
 Jim Penman – founder of Jim's Group and historian
 Ameet Bains - CEO of Western Bulldogs

Media, entertainment, and the arts 
Oscar Asche – actor, director, and writer
John Brack – artist
John Bryson – author
James Campbell – journalist
Manning Clark – historian and Australian of the Year
Robin Casinader – musician
Erle Cox – journalist and science fiction writer
Caroline Craig – actress
Andrew Daddo – actor, voice artist, author and television personality
Jonathan Dawson – screenwriter, director, academic and columnist
Keith Dunstan – journalist and author
Peggy Frew – ARIA-winning composer and novelist
Ian Gawler – author
William Hay – historical author
 Sir Randal Heymanson – journalist
Leslie Howard – decorated pianist
Barry Humphries – Tony award-winning actor and comedian
Barrie Kosky – opera and theatre director
Nam Le – writer
Derwent Lees – landscape painter
Terence (Terry) James McCrann – Australia's leading business journalist
 Sir William McKie – former Organist and Master of the Choristers at Westminster Abbey
Christopher Muir – producer, director and Head of ABC Television drama
Ken Myer – founding chairman of the ABC and patron for the arts
Rupert Myer – Chairman of the Australia Council for the Arts
Hugo Race – musician
Dan Robinson – singer
 Nick Russell – television actor, producer, and director
Michael Schildberger – journalist and host of A Current Affair
Rob Sitch – film director, producer, and screenwriter
Geoffrey Simon – orchestra conductor
Sir Frank Tait - theatre entrepreneur
Frank Thring – actor in Ben-Hur and King of Kings
Mick Turner – musician (Dirty Three) and artist
Li-Wei Qin – international concert cellist
Chester Wilmot – war correspondent

Sport

AFL
see also: Old Melburnians Football Club
James Aitken
Jack Atkins
Dick Atkinson
Simon Beaumont
Toby Bedford
Sam Berry (footballer)
Arthur Best
Lewis Blackmore
Rohan Browne
Murray Clapham
Dylan Clarke
Ryan Clarke
Jack Cockbill
John Conway – captain of Carlton and cricketer
Peter Cooper
David Cordner
Don Cordner –  Brownlow Medallist, 2-time Premiership winner, captain of Melbourne, and doctor
Harry Cordner
Simon Crawshay
David Cuningham
Percy Damman
Johnny Dando
Simon Deacon
Bill Denehy
Nathan Drummond
Frank Dossetor
Harcourt Dowsley – AFL player and cricketer
Kyle Dunkley
Xavier Ellis – Premiership player for Hawthorn
Shaun Edwards
Ken Forge
Simon Fraser – AFL player and Olympic rower
Corrie Gardner – first Premiership winner for Melbourne and Olympic hurdler
Eric Gardner
Mark Gardner
Ed Garlick
David Gaunson
Dave Gibson
Audley Gillespie-Jones
Hugh Goddard
John Goold – 2-time Premiership winner for Carlton
Steven Greene
Stuart Griffiths
Housie Grounds
Herbert Guthrie – AFL player and cricketer
Jack Hawkins
Tom Hawkins – 5x All Australian,  3x premiership player, Coleman medallist , All Australian captain
Michael Hawkins (footballer)
Robb Hawkins
Will Hayes
Wilfrid Heron
Maurie Herring – Premiership winner for Melbourne
Herb Hunter – champion athlete, dentist and AFL player
Alex Keath – AFL player and cricketer
Graham Kerr
John Kerr
Bruce Lang
Ed Langdon -Premiership winner for Melbourne
Mark Langdon
Tom Langdon
Chris Langford – 4-time Premiership winner, Hawthorn Football Club captain and AFL commissioner
Ron Larking
Ben Long
Ned Long
Steven May – Melbourne premiership full-back, Indigenous all-star, 2x All-Australian
Ken McKaige
Peter McLean – 2-time Premiership winner for Melbourne and Carlton
Ian McMullin
Zach Merrett – Captain of Essendon, 3x best-and-fairest winner, 2x All-Australian
Luke Mitchell
Derek Mollison – AFL player and military officer
George O'Mullane – AFL player and cricketer
Jeremy Nichols
Jackson Paine
Leslie Rainey – AFL player, tennis player and cricketer
Fletcher Roberts – Premiership winner for Western Bulldogs
Brian Roet – Premiership winner for Melbourne
Ken Rollason
Ron Rutherford
Cyril Seelenmeyer
Jack Shelley
Joe Shelley
Peter V. Smith
Charlie Spargo - Premiership player
Jim Sprigg
Cyril Steele
Ian Synman – Premiership player and prominent Jewish player
Bonnie Toogood – AFLW Premiership winner for Western Bulldogs
Matt Thomas
Andrew Thompson
John Tilbrook
Athol Tymms – AFL player and doctor
Ed Vickers-Willis
Francis Vine – Premiership winner and captain of Melbourne
Jack P. Walker – VFL player and soldier
Fred Warry
Josh Ward
Russ Watson – AFL player, cricketer and athlete
Andrew Witts
Mal Williams – AFL player and soldier
Barney Wood – AFL player, cricketer, motorsports driver and soldier
Mike Woods

Athletics 
Joel Baden – Olympic high jumper
Sam Baines – youth record holder for 110m hurdles
Dennis Duigan – Olympic decathlete
Edwin Flack (Teddy) – 2-time Olympic gold medallist, Australia's first Olympian and earning Australia's first gold medal
Henry Frayne – Olympic triple jumper
Lachlan Francis Gooley – Champion sprinter, represented Malvern in several meets through the late 1990s and early 2000s
Corrie Gardner – national Australian hurdle champion, Olympic hurdler, and AFL player
Peter Gardner – Olympic hurdler
Sir Wilfrid Kent Hughes – Rhodes Scholar, politician, Olympic hurdler, and organiser of the 1956 Olympics
Herb Hunter – champion athlete, dentist, and AFL player
Charles Lane – Olympic sprinter
Jack Newman – Olympic middle-distance runner
Fred Woodhouse – Olympic pole vaulter

Basketball 
Dane Pineau – centre for the Sydney Kings

Cricket 
Robert James Parish CMG OBE – cricket administrator and Chairman of ACB 1966–1969 and a second term from 1975 to 1980
Ted à Beckett – cricket all-rounder
Richard Bell – English bowler
John Conway – cricketer and AFL player
Sir John George Davies – cricketer and mayor of Hobart
Harcourt Dowsley – cricketer and AFL player
Herbert Guthrie – cricketer and AFL player
Alex Keath – cricketer and AFL player
Wallscourt Kelly – bowler
William Moule – politician and cricketer
George O'Mullane – wicketkeeper and AFL player
Ernest Osborne – bowler

Field Hockey 
Lachlan Dreher – 3-time Olympic medallist
Danni Roche – Olympic gold medallist

Golf 
Ivo Whitton – 5-time Australian Open winner

Rowing 
Clive Baillieu – businessman, public servant, and rower
David Colvin – 10-time King's Cup champion and Olympic coxswain
David Crawshay – Olympic gold medallist
Ben Dodwell – rower, Olympic medallist, and 9-time national champion
Karsten Forsterling – Olympic silver medallist
Simon Fraser – Olympic rower, first Australian Henley winner, and AFL player
Lewis Luxton – Olympic rower
Timothy Masters – Olympic rower
Andrew Michelmore – Rhodes Scholar, mining executive, and first Australian gold medal for rowing
Jessica Morrison – Olympic gold medalist
David Webster – 2-time World Champion coxswain
Tim Webster – coxswain

Rugby 
Alec Boswell Timms – national rugby player for Scotland and the British Isles

Sailing 
Tom King – sailor, Olympic gold medallist
Simon Mckeon – champion yachtsman, businessman, lawyer, philanthropist, and Australian of the Year

Snowsports 
Cam Bolton – Olympic snowboarder
Anton Grimus – Olympic freestyle skier
Sir Wilfrid Kent Hughes – first Australian overseas skier
Piers Jalland – Olympic tobogganist, colloquially known as “The beast of Buller”

Soccer 
Stefan Nigro – A-League player
Jason Davidson

Tennis 
Sir Norman Brookes – Wimbledon and Davis Cup champion, businessman, and eponym of Australian Open trophy
Colin Long – 4-time Australian Open champion in mixed doubles
Arthur O'Hara Wood – Australian Open champion
Pat O'Hara Wood – 2-time Grand Slam winner in singles and 6-time Grand Slam winner in doubles

References

External links 
 Meet Our Alumni at Melbourne Grammar School

Lists of people educated in Victoria (Australia) by school affiliation
People educated at Melbourne Grammar School
 List